The 2007–08 South Pacific cyclone season was one of the least active South Pacific tropical cyclone seasons on record, with only four tropical cyclones occurring within the South Pacific basin to the east of 160°E. The season officially ran from November 1, 2007, until April 30, 2008, although the first cyclone, Tropical Depression 01F, developed on October 17. After the season had ended, the names Daman, Funa, and Gene were retired from the tropical cyclone naming lists.

During the season, tropical cyclones were officially monitored by the Regional Specialized Meteorological Centre (RSMC) in Nadi, Fiji, and the Tropical Cyclone Warning Centre (TCWC) in Wellington, New Zealand. Throughout the season the United States Navy and Air force also monitored the basin and issued unofficial warnings, through its Joint Typhoon Warning Center (JTWC). Tropical cyclones that were located between 160°E and 120°W as well as the Equator and 25°S were monitored by RSMC Nadi while any that were located to the south of 25°S between 160°E and 120°W were monitored by TCWC Wellington. During the season, RSMC Nadi and TCWC Wellington estimated sustained windspeeds over a 10-minute period and used the Australian Tropical Cyclone intensity scale, while the JTWC estimated sustained windspeeds over a 1-minute period with windspeeds compared to the Saffir–Simpson hurricane scale.



Seasonal forecasts 

During October 2007, both RSMC Nadi and New Zealand's National Institute of Water and Atmospheric Research (NIWA), issued forecasts for a near to below average season, due to the presence of a weak La Niña event. As a result of these conditions, neither agency predicted how many tropical cyclones would develop but noted that on average 6–8 cyclones could be expected to develop during a weak La Niña season. According to RSMC Nadi, Fiji was likely to be affected by one to two tropical cyclones, while two to three were likely to pass through Fiji's exclusive economic zone. However this prediction was revised in early February, after Daman, Funa and Gene had affected the archipelago. According to NIWA there was an average risk of a tropical cyclone coming within 550 km (340 mi) of Tuvalu, Fiji, Tonga, Tokelau, Wallis and Futuna, and Northern New Zealand, while the risks for the Solomon Islands, Vanuatu, New Caledonia, Samoa and Niue were variable and uncertain. All other islands though faced a reduced risk off being affected by a tropical cyclone.

Seasonal summary 

On October 17, RSMC Nadi reported that Tropical Depression 01F had developed about 670 km (420 mi) to the west of the Solomon Islands. Over the next few days, the depression moved slowly towards the east, before RSMC Nadi issued their final advisory on 01F early on October 19, as it had become sheared and had weakened into a tropical low. After 01F weakened into a tropical low-pressure system and dissipated the basin remained quiet until November 20 when Tropical Disturbance 02F developed into a tropical depression. After developing into a tropical depression, 02F remained weak and unorganized before rapidly dissipating during November 22.

Systems

Tropical Depression 02F 

Tropical Disturbance 02F developed within the South Pacific convergence zone on November 20, about 900 km (560 mi) to the northeast of Suva, Fiji. During that day the disturbance moved towards the south and slightly developed further before it was designated as Tropical Depression 02F. However convection surrounding the system was poorly organized and remained so over the next couple of days, as it moved southwards into an area of high vertical windshear and cooler sea surface temperatures. The depression was subsequently last noted on November 22, as it dragged a convergence zone over Fiji which led to an episode of significant widespread rain and brought fresh to strong winds to Fiji.

Tropical Depression 03F 

On November 22, RSMC Nadi reported that a weak tropical disturbance had developed on the edge of the basin, about 285 km (175 mi) to the south of Honiara on the Solomon Island of Guadalcanal. Over the next couple of days the depression moved towards the east and gradually developed further before RSMC Nadi designated it as Tropical Disturbance 03F on November 24, while it was located about 400 km (250 mi) to the northeast of Port Vila on the Vanuatuan island of Efate. During that day the disturbance continued to move eastwards before later that day, RSMC Nadi reported that 03F had developed into a tropical depression.

Severe Tropical Cyclone Daman 

Cyclone Daman was the strongest cyclone of the season. On December 3, the Regional Specialized Meteorological Centre (RSMC) in Nadi, Fiji, upgraded a tropical disturbance, located to the west of the Solomon Islands, to Tropical Depression 04F. On December 5, as the depression moved towards the west into the Fijian archipelago, both the Joint Typhoon Warning Center (JTWC) and RSMC Nadi upgraded it to Cyclone Daman. On December 7 the cyclone reached its peak intensity with winds of 185 km/h, (115 mph 10-minute sustained) which made Daman a Category 4 cyclone on the Australian Tropical Cyclone Intensity Scale. Early on December 8, Cyclone Daman brushed by the Fijian island of Cikobia, causing damage to housing, crops and vegetation. Daman then weakened the next day into a tropical depression and dissipated on December 10.

Tropical Depression 05F 

Convection surrounding the depression was not organized and was only active within the northern and eastern quadrants. Over the next few days RSMC Nadi issued special weather bulletins for the Southern Cook Islands as 05F and an intense high-pressure system were forecast to produce gale-force winds over several of the Cook Islands. The depression was then last noted by RSMC Nadi on December 14, as it and the high-pressure system started to weaken after causing gale-force winds, flooding and significant swells.

Tropical Disturbance 06F 

On December 26, RSMC Nadi reported that Tropical Disturbance 06F had developed about 680 km (420 mi) to the northeast of Avarau on the Southern Cook Island of Rarotonga in an area of high vertical windshear. Over the next couple of days, the system moved towards the south and convection surrounding the system remained unorganized, while the low level circulation centre was detached from the convection and became exposed. The disturbance was last noted by RSMC Nadi on December 28, as it approached TCWC Wellington's area of responsibility.

Tropical Cyclone Elisa 

At 1800 UTC on January 7, RSMC Nadi reported that a poorly organized Tropical Depression 07F, had developed within a slow moving trough of low pressure about 600 km (370 mi), to the east of Suva, Fiji. The JTWC then started to monitor 07F during January 8 and reported that convection was displaced to the south of the systems well defined low level circulation center, however an upper-level low was preventing convection directly forming over the center. Over the next couple of days, the depression slowly developed further as it moved towards the south in an area of hostile vertical windshear. RSMC Nadi and the JTWC then reported at 0000 UTC on January 10, that 07F had developed into a tropical cyclone with RSMC Nadi naming it Elisa while located about 55 km (35 mi) to the southwest of Nukuʻalofa, Tonga. During January 11, Elisa recurved towards the southeast into a region of cooler waters and stronger windshear, as a result the cyclone weakened into a depression, with RSMC Nadi and the JTWC issuing their final advisories later that day.

Elisa brought heavy rain to Tonga and Niue, and damaged several fruit-bearing trees in Tongatapu and Eua. High seas and a high surf moved several small vessels and fishing boats ashore in Nukuʻalofa.

Tropical Depression 08F 

On January 9, RSMC Nadi designated a low-pressure area northeast of Vanuatu as Tropical Depression 08F. The depression moved eastwards over the next few days but did not intensify any further. RSMC Nadi then downgraded the depression to a tropical disturbance early on January 14 and then released their final tropical disturbance summary.

Severe Tropical Cyclone Funa 

On February 15, RSMC Nadi and the JTWC reported that a tropical depression had developed within a monsoon trough, about 700 km (435 mi) to the northeast of Port Vila on the Vanuatuan island of Efate. During that day the depression moved eastwards and gradually developed further, before as vertical windshear slackened a little, the JTWC and RSMC Nadi reported that the depression had developed into a tropical cyclone with the later naming it as Funa at 0600 UTC on February 16.

The storm then moved into TCWC Wellington area of responsibility it started to weaken and then became extra tropical the next day with the JTWC issuing their final advisory on January 20, with TCWC Wellington downgrading it to a low later that day.

Tropical Depression 11F 

RSMC Nadi identified a Tropical Disturbance in the southern Central Pacific Ocean located to the east of Pago Pago on January 19 and started to issue summaries on it. The next day it intensified into a tropical depression and was designated the number 11F by RSMC Nadi. However the tropical depression did not strengthen any further as it moved southwards towards the edge of RSMC Nadi's area of responsibility with TCWC Wellington. Late on January 23 RSMC Nadi issued its last warnings on 11F as the depression had moved into TCWC Wellingtons area of responsibility. However the next day the system became extratropical as it was about southwest of Tonga'tapu.

Severe Tropical Cyclone Gene 

The disturbance initially moved towards the southeast before it recurved and started to move towards the southwest and Fiji during the next day, while gradually developing further in an area of low vertical windshear. At 1800 UTC on January 27, the JTWC reported that the disturbance had developed into Tropical Cyclone 15P, while it moved towards the southwest and hugged Vanua Levu's southeastern coast, under the influence of a ridge of high pressure that was located to the southeast of the system. 15P's development was hindered while it was located over land, however it did not weaken significantly because it was located in an area of favourable upper-level conditions. As the centre of 15P emerged into and passed over the Bligh Waters, convection erupted around the system and for humanitarian reasons, RSMC Nadi named the system, Gene at 0000 UTC on January 28, before 6 hours later reporting that Gene had become a Category 1 tropical cyclone.

During that day the newly named cyclone, moved towards the west-southwest across the Bligh Water, before it made landfall near Lautoka, Viti Levu, as a Category 1 tropical cyclone. After it emerged back into the Pacific Ocean Gene intensified slowly. becoming a Category 3 severe tropical cyclone on January 30. Gene then reached its peak winds of  the next day. It kept this intensity until it had crossed 25°S and had moved into TCWC Wellington's Area of responsibility, when Gene intensified back into a severe tropical cyclone. Gene then slowly weakened with JTWC reporting that Gene had become an extra tropical cyclone on February 6. TCWC Wellington then released their final advisory on February 9.

Cyclone Gene caused widespread damage to several of Fiji's main islands, including Viti Levu, Vanua Levu, Taveuni, Yasawa, Mamanuca, and other outlying island groups, and killed 8 people. The cyclone also caused severe damage to Vanautu's Futuna island after its outer bands lashed the island with gale-force windspeeds and heavy rain for 12 hours.

Tropical Depression 14F 

On March 19, an area of disturbed weather west of Vanuatu, was designated as Tropical Disturbance 14F by RSMC Nadi. Later that day 14F had intensified enough to be upgraded to a tropical depression by RSMC Nadi. The next day the Joint Typhoon Warning Center (JTWC) issued a Tropical Cyclone Formation Alert on the depression. Later that day the JTWC initiated advisories on the depression designating it as Tropical Cyclone 24P. The Tropical Depression then reached its peak wind speeds of  that day. On March 21, The Depression encountered an unfavourable environment of moderate to high vertical wind shear and weakened with the JTWC issuing its final advisory that day. Early on March 22 RSMC Nadi downgraded Tropical Depression 14F to Tropical Disturbance 14F and then the next day issued their last advisory on the tropical disturbance.

Tropical Depression 15F 

During that day as the system moved into the South Pacific basin, it developed into a tropical depression.

Tropical Depression 16F 

On April 16, a tropical disturbance developed about 1365 km (835 mi) northwest of New Caledonia, consisting of an elongated circulation within a marginal upper-level environment. Despite anticipation that tropical cyclogenesis was unlikely in the short term, deep convection rapidly developed over an increasingly better defined circulation, with an anticyclone aloft aiding in intensification. Late on April 17, the Fiji Meteorological Service classified the system as Tropical Depression 16F, and early the next day the Joint Typhoon Warning Center classified it as Tropical Cyclone 27P. Initially, it was forecast to intensify further; however, the storm quickly became disorganized as wind shear increased. At 0000 UTC on April 19, the JTWC issued its final warning on the system as it began dissipating. with RSMC Nadi issuing its final tropical disturbance summary on the depression later that day.

Other systems 

During January 12, the FMS reported that Tropical Depression 09F had developed over southern Tonga to the northwest of the island of Tongatapu. The system was located within an area of high vertical wind shear, while atmospheric convection associated with the system was active within the eastern and southern quadrants. Over the next day, the system moved south-southeastwards and its low-level cyclonic curvature became difficult to see in satellite imagery, before it was last noted later that day.

During the next day, the depression moved towards the south and was last noted by RSMC Nadi during the next day, as it moved into TCWC Wellington's area of responsibility.

Season effects 

|-
|  ||  || bgcolor=#| || bgcolor=#| || bgcolor=#| || Solomon Islands || None || None ||
|-
|  ||  || bgcolor=#| || bgcolor=#| || bgcolor=#| || Fiji || None || None ||
|-
|  ||  || bgcolor=#| || bgcolor=#| || bgcolor=#| || || || ||
|-
|  ||  || bgcolor=#| || bgcolor=#| || bgcolor=#|  || Fiji, Tonga ||  || None ||
|-
|  ||  || bgcolor=#| || bgcolor=#| || bgcolor=#| || || || ||
|-
|  ||  || bgcolor=#| || bgcolor=#| || bgcolor=#| || || || ||
|-
|  ||  || bgcolor=#| || bgcolor=#| || bgcolor=#| || || || ||
|-
|  ||  || bgcolor=#| || bgcolor=#| || bgcolor=#| || || || ||
|-
|  ||  || bgcolor=#| || bgcolor=#| || bgcolor=#| || Tonga || None || None ||
|-
|  ||  || bgcolor=#| || bgcolor=#| || bgcolor=#| ||	Vanuatu, New Zealand || || None ||
|-
|  ||  || bgcolor=#| || bgcolor=#| || bgcolor=#| || || || ||
|-
|  ||  || bgcolor=#| || bgcolor=#| || bgcolor=#||| Fiji, New Caledonia, Vanuatu ||  || 8 ||
|-
|  ||  || bgcolor=#| || bgcolor=#| || bgcolor=#| || None || || ||
|-
|  ||  || bgcolor=#| || bgcolor=#| || bgcolor=#| || None || None || None ||
|-
|  ||  || bgcolor=#| || bgcolor=#| || bgcolor=#| || None || None || ||
|-
|  ||  || bgcolor=#| || bgcolor=#| || bgcolor=#| || New Caledonia || None || None ||
|-

See also 

 Tropical cyclones in 2007 and 2008
 Atlantic hurricane seasons: 2007, 2008
 Pacific hurricane seasons: 2007, 2008
 Pacific typhoon seasons: 2007, 2008
 North Indian Ocean cyclone seasons: 2007, 2008

References

External links 

 
South Pacific cyclone seasons
Articles which contain graphical timelines
2007 SPac
2008 SPac